Malle Gevallen  is a 1934 Dutch film directed by Jaap Speyer.

Cast

External links 
 

1934 films
Dutch black-and-white films
Films directed by Jaap Speyer
Dutch musical comedy films
1934 musical comedy films